The 2003 Hungarian Figure Skating Championships took place between January 17 and 18, 2003 in Budapest. Skaters competed in the disciplines of men's singles, ladies' singles, and ice dancing on the senior level. The results were used to choose the Hungarian teams to the 2003 World Championships and the 2003 European Championships.

Results

Men

Ladies

Ice dancing

External links
 results

Hungarian Figure Skating Championships
Hungarian Figure Skating Championships, 2003
Figure skating